The TVR T350 is a sports car manufactured by British automobile manufacturer TVR from 2002 to 2006. The T350 was available in coupe and targa versions, the coupe version being known as the T350C, and the targa version the T350T. The T350 later formed the base of the Sagaris.

The smooth frontal nose and the sharp rear cut tail allows the car to be aerodynamically efficient while reducing drag. The sloping rear line of the car ensures that the car generates minimum lift at high speeds.

The car takes many components from the entry level Tamora such as the interior, multi-function display and analogue metres. The optional Sport package adds extra options in the multi-functional display such as lap-times, oil temperature and water temperature. The fastback design of the car gives the customer an advantage of increased boot space.

Specifications

Engine: TVR Speed Six engine, Straight-6 (6-cylinder inline alloy engine with 4 valves per cylinder and dry sump lubrication)
Engine size: 3605 cc (3.6L)
Bore/stroke:  x 
Compression Ratio: 11.8:1
Power Output:  at 7200 rpm
Torque Output:  at 5500 rpm
Power-to-Weight Ratio: 304 bhp/ton
Valvetrain setup: 4 valves per cylinder

Suspension
Front: Independent, double wishbones, coil-over gas dampers, sway bars
Rear: Independent, double wishbones, coil-over gas dampers, sway bars

Brakes
Front:  ventilated disc brakes with 4 piston alloy callipers.
Rear:  ventilated disc brakes with single piston sliding callipers.

Wheels
Wheels: 18 inch seven-spoke spider aluminum alloy wheels in Anthracite or Silver
Tyres - Front: Goodyear Eagle F1 GDS3 225/35 ZR18 tyres at 24 psi (30 psi Track/sustained high speed / fully laden)
Tyres - Rear: Goodyear Eagle F1 GDS3 235/40 ZR18 tyres at 24 psi (32 psi Track/sustained high speed / fully laden)

Steering
Electro Hydraulic Power assisted rack and pinion.

Chassis/body
Body Panels: Glass Reinforced Plastic
Weight: 
Weight Distribution - Front: 51.9% 
Weight Distribution - Rear: 48.1% 
Length Overall: 
Wheelbase: 
Width Overall: 
Height Overall: 
Front Track: 
Rear Track: 
Ground Clearance: 

Performance
Top speed: 190 mph (310 km/h) estimated (officially stated as > 175 mph)
0 to : 4.4 seconds
0 to : 9.5 seconds

References

External links
 TVR T350 at Racing Green TVR

T350
Sports cars

Cars introduced in 2002